John Francis Noll (January 25, 1875 – July 31, 1956) was an American prelate of the  Roman Catholic Church. He served as bishop of the Diocese of Fort Wayne in Indiana from 1925 until his death in 1956. 

Noll was active in national church organizations.  In 1912, he founded the weekly newspaper Our Sunday Visitor.  Noll was called one of the most influential Catholics of his day.

Biography

Early life 
John Noll was born on January 25, 1875, in Fort Wayne, Indiana, one of nineteen children. He attended St. Lawrence Seminary in Mt. Calvary, Wisconsin, from 1888 to 1893.

Priesthood 
Noll was ordained a priest on June 4, 1898, for the Diocese of Fort Wayne  by Bishop Joseph Rademacher.  After his ordination, Noll was assigned to a pastoral position at St. Patrick Parish in Ligonier, Indiana. As a young priest, he frequently challenged anti-Catholicism in the area. He sometimes confronted people claiming to be former priests or nuns with tales of evil practices within the Church. Noll would ask them to prove their identify by asking the name of their religious order or by requesting the recitation of a specific prayer. Sometimes he would pose his questions in Latin.  These tactics frequently exposed the speaker as a fraud.

In 1910, Noll was named pastor of St. Mary's Catholic Parish in Huntington, Indiana. Noll bought a printing press and in 1912 founded the weekly newspaper Our Sunday Visitor (OSV)  It became widely distributed at many parishes as a supplement or in coordination with the local paper.  For a time, it became a popular Catholic newsweekly nationwide. All OSV profits went to religious, educational and charitable causes. He embraced the communication tools of his day — print, radio and television. Noll served on the boards of the Catholic Press Association and the Catholic Church Extension Society. He was named a monsignor in 1921.

Bishop of Fort Wayne 
Noll was appointed fifth bishop of the Diocese of Fort Wayne by Pope Pius XI on May 12, 1925. Noll was consecrated on July 30, 1925, by Archbishop George Mundelein.

As a bishop, he built a preparatory seminary, several high schools, and an orphanage, and during the Great Depression reorganized the system of Catholic charities. He was active as an organizer the national level, and chaired the Department of Lay Organizations of the National Catholic Welfare Conference. Noll was instrumental in generating support for construction of the Basilica of the Immaculate Conception, in Washington, D.C.

Pope Pius XII elevated Noll to archbishop ad personam on September 2, 1953, meaning that the title was personal to Noll and not passed on to his successors. Noll wrote Father Smith Instructs Jackson.

Political activism 
Noll was strongly associated with conservative elements of the Church during his career as a journalist and churchman, linking arms with the more rabid end of the anti-communist movement in the United States and elsewhere. This included condemnation of many labor unions—much to the chagrin several fellow bishops—and collaboration with the infamous radio priest Charles Coughlin.

Death and legacy 
John Noll died on July 31, 1956, and is buried in the Victory Noll Cemetery in Huntington, Indiana. Sister Maria Stanisia painted a portrait of Noll and the Bishop Noll Institute is named in his honor.

Further reading
 Delaney, John J. Dictionary of American Catholic Biography (1984) pp 423–24
 Ginder, Richard. With Ink and Crosier: The Story o f Bishop Noll and His Work (Huntington: Our Sunday Visitor Press, 1953)
Stromberg, J. 2006. The Story of Archbishop John Noll, Founder of "Our Sunday Visitor". Catholic Parent, July/August 2006, pp. 18–22.

References

1875 births
1956 deaths
20th-century Roman Catholic bishops in the United States
American Roman Catholic religious writers
People from Fort Wayne, Indiana
Roman Catholic bishops of Fort Wayne
Writers from Indiana
People from Huntington, Indiana
Catholics from Indiana